is a Japanese manga series written and illustrated by 	Yuko Osada and Kazuya Machida. It has been serialized in Square Enix's seinen manga magazine Monthly Big Gangan since October 2013.

Publication
Square Enix has collected its chapters into individual tankōbon volumes. The first two volumes were released on November 27, 2014. As of September 24, 2022, nineteen volumes have been released.

Volume list

See also
 Toto!: The Wonderful Adventure, another manga series by Yuko Osada

References

External links
  

Cultural depictions of Jimi Hendrix
Gangan Comics manga
Music in anime and manga
Seinen manga